Menorah may refer to: 
 Jewish candelabra:
 Temple menorah, a seven-lamp candelabrum used in the ancient Tabernacle in the desert, the Temple in Jerusalem, and synagogues
 Hanukkah menorah or hanukkiyah, a nine-lamp candelabrum used on the Jewish holiday of Hanukkah
 Knesset Menorah,  a bronze monument in front of the Knesset in Israel
 Menorah Medical Center, an acute care hospital in Overland Park, Kansas
 Menorah church, a Christian fundamentalist congregation in Switzerland founded by Bruno Meyer

See also 
 Menora (disambiguation)